Gubaryovo is a rural locality (a selo) and the administrative center of Gubaryovskoye Rural Settlement, Semiluksky District, Voronezh Oblast, Russia. The population was 956 as of 2010. There are 18 streets.

Geography 
Gubaryovo is located on the right bank of the Veduga, 11 km north of Semiluki (the district's administrative centre) by road. Ternovoye is the nearest rural locality.

References 

Rural localities in Semiluksky District